The Blockhouse Point Light is a lighthouse at Rocky Point, Prince Edward Island, Canada, on the western shore of Charlottetown Harbour. The present lighthouse, constructed in 1876, replaced older lighthouses at the site which are believed to have been constructed as early as 1846 to serve as a light for the harbour. The lighthouse is active , and consists of an  wooden pyramidal tower, attached to a two-storey keeper's house.

See also 
List of lighthouses in Prince Edward Island

References

External links 
Friends of the Blockhouse

Lighthouses in Prince Edward Island
Lighthouses completed in 1876
1876 establishments in Canada
Buildings and structures in Queens County, Prince Edward Island